Clément Sordet (born 22 October 1992) is a French professional golfer.

Sordet played college golf at Texas Tech where he won six times. After graduating in 2015 and playing in the Palmer Cup, Sordet turned professional. He began playing on the Challenge Tour.  In August 2015, he won his first tournament as a professional, at the Northern Ireland Open, playing on a national invitation. It was only his fourth event as a professional. Sordet finished 2015 by finishing joint runner-up in the Thailand Golf Championship. This was one of the Open Qualifying Series and gained him entry to the 2016 Open Championship.

Sordet won his second professional tournament on the Challenge Tour in 2016 at the Turkish Airlines Challenge. Then in 2017, he won both the Viking Challenge and NBO Golf Classic Grand Final and finished second on the 2017 Challenge Tour Order of Merit, which earned him full-time status on the European Tour for 2018.

Amateur wins
2011 The Carmel Cup, UTSA/Oak Hills Invitational (tied)
2013 Black Horse Match
2014 Middleburg Bank Intercollegiate
2015 Wyoming Desert Intercollegiate, NCAA Lubbock Regional (tie with Blair Hamilton)

Source:

Professional wins (6)

Sunshine Tour wins (1)

1Co-sanctioned by the Challenge Tour

Sunshine Tour playoff record (1–0)

Challenge Tour wins (5)

*Note: The 2017 Viking Challenge was shortened to 54 holes due to rain.
1Co-sanctioned by the Sunshine Tour

Challenge Tour playoff record (1–0)

Alps Tour wins (1)

Results in major championships

CUT = missed the half-way cut
"T" = tied for place

Team appearances
Amateur
European Boys' Team Championship (representing France): 2009, 2010
European Amateur Team Championship (representing France): 2013, 2014
Eisenhower Trophy (representing France): 2014
Palmer Cup (represent Europe): 2015

See also
List of golfers with most Challenge Tour wins
2017 Challenge Tour graduates
2018 European Tour Qualifying School graduates
2022 Challenge Tour graduates

References

External links

French male golfers
Texas Tech Red Raiders men's golfers
European Tour golfers
Sportspeople from Lyon
1992 births
Living people